Xavier Ricardo Arreaga Bermello (born 28 September 1994) is an Ecuadorian professional footballer who plays as a defender for Major League Soccer club Seattle Sounders FC and the Ecuador national team.

Career
Arreaga made his debut for Ecuador on 20 November 2018 in a match against Panama.

After four seasons with Barcelona S.C. in the Ecuadorian Serie A, Arreaga was signed by the Sounders on 7 May 2019. He joined the team later that month as a replacement for retiring defender Chad Marshall and made his debut on 26 May 2019 against Sporting Kansas City.

Career statistics

Club 

3 leagues cup 2021

International 

Scores and results list Ecuador's goal tally first, score column indicates score after each Arreaga goal.

Honours
Barcelona S.C.
Ecuadorian Serie A: 2016

Seattle Sounders FC
MLS Cup: 2019
CONCACAF Champions League: 2022

Individual
CONCACAF Champions League Best XI: 2022

References

External links
Xavier Arreaga profile at Federación Ecuatoriana de Fútbol 

1994 births
Living people
Sportspeople from Guayaquil
Ecuadorian footballers
Association football defenders
Ecuadorian Serie A players
Ecuadorian Serie B players
Manta F.C. footballers
Barcelona S.C. footballers
Major League Soccer players
Designated Players (MLS)
Seattle Sounders FC players
Ecuador international footballers
2019 Copa América players
2021 Copa América players
2022 FIFA World Cup players